Clontarf Road railway station is a railway station in Dublin, Ireland, on the DART commuter rail line.

Location
It is located at the south-western end of Clontarf Road on Dublin's Northside, on the border between Clontarf and Fairview, and serves people living and working in those areas, as well as Marino and East Wall. The station is situated just north of Fairview DART depot. It was built to serve the densely populated areas about, and also East Point Business Park and was opened on 1 September 1997. The station has a car park and is served by a shuttle to the East Point Business Park; it is also the terminus of the 104 bus operated by Go-Ahead Ireland (formerly by Dublin Bus, which runs hourly to DCU via Beaumont Hospital)

The ticket office is open between 05:45 to 19:45, Monday to Sunday. Part of the car park at the station is rented out to Westwood Fitness Club.

Previous station for area
The area was last served by the old Clontarf Station, almost a half a mile (nearly 1 kilometre) north on the line.  The remnants of that station can still be seen at the rail bridge over Howth Road, halfway between the start of that road and Killester village centre. This original Clontarf station was opened on 25 May 1844 and finally closed on 3 September 1956.

See also
 List of railway stations in Ireland

References

External links
 Irish Rail Clontarf Road Station website
 Eiretrains - Clontarf Road Station
 Eiretrains - Clontarf Station

Iarnród Éireann stations in Dublin (city)
Railway stations opened in 1997
1997 establishments in Ireland
Railway stations in the Republic of Ireland opened in the 20th century